Tupac: Resurrection is a soundtrack album for the Academy Award-nominated documentary of the same name. It was released on November 14, 2003 by Amaru Entertainment and Interscope Records.

Background
It includes several previously released 2Pac  recordings, including "Death Around the Corner" from Me Against the World, "Secretz of War" from Still I Rise, "Holler If Ya Hear Me" from Strictly 4 My N.I.G.G.A.Z. and "Rebel of the Underground" from 2Pacalypse Now; and unreleased 2Pac verses re-constructed into new tracks such as "Ghost", "One Day at a Time", and "Runnin (Dying to Live)".

Singles

Production
Tupac's mother Afeni Shakur and Eminem executively produced the album.

The album features The Notorious B.I.G., Eminem, 50 Cent, Outlawz, and Digital Underground.

"Intro", "Ghost", "Death Around The Corner", "Bury Me A G" and "Str8 Ballin do not actually feature in the movie, but appear on the album.

Critical reception

The album received mixed to positive reviews.

Commercial performance
The album sold more than 420,000 copies in its first week, debuting at number two on the Billboard 200 behind Jay-Z's The Black Album.

It sold 1,666,335 copies in the United States as of 2011.

It went platinum in the United States and gold in the United Kingdom.

Awards and nominations
The song "Runnin' (Dying to Live)" won the Top Soundtrack Song of the Year award at the 2005 ASCAP Rhythm & Soul Music Awards.

Track listing

Sample credits
"Runnin' (Dying to Live)"
"Dying to Live" by Edgar Winter 
"The Realist Killaz"
"Hail Mary" by Makaveli
"Starin' Through My Rear View"
"In The Air Tonight" by Phil Collins

Charts

Weekly Charts

Year-end charts

Certifications

References

Soundtracks published posthumously
Hip hop soundtracks
Albums produced by Eminem
Albums produced by DJ Pooh
Albums produced by Johnny "J"
2003 soundtrack albums
Interscope Records soundtracks
Tupac Shakur soundtracks
Gangsta rap soundtracks
Documentary film soundtracks